James Harley (born 1959) is a Canadian composer, author, and professor of music born in Vernon, British Columbia. His creative output consists of orchestral, chamber, solo, electroacoustic, and vocal music.

Studies
Harley studied at Western Washington University (B.Mus, magna cum laude, 1977–1982), Royal Academy of Music (1983–1985), Université de Paris (1986–1987), Fryderyk Chopin Academy of Music, Warsaw (1987–1988), and McGill University (D.Mus., 1988–1994).

Teaching
He has taught at the Faculty of Music at McGill University (1989–1995), Wilfrid Laurier University (1995–1996), California Institute of the Arts (1997), University of Southern California (1997), and Minnesota State University Moorhead (1999–2004). In 2004, he took up a tenure-track position in music at University of Guelph, where he is associate professor.

Harley is also the author of the book Xenakis: His Life in Music. His areas of expertise and specialization include digital music, composition, contemporary music analysis, and history of electronic/computer music. Music and research by James Harley is represented by Art Music Promotion.

List of works
Orchestra
Along the Riverrun (1983) 10 min.
Version I: 1111/1100/timp/66643
Version II: strings (20220 concertante/66644 orchestra)
Overture Divertimento (1984) 8 min. 2222/2220/timp/strings
Windprints (1989) 15 min. 2222/4221/3 perc/pf/strings
Kekula (Memories of a Landscape – III) (1992) 15 min. 2222/4221/strings
N(ouvelle)aissance (1994) 16 min. 1202/2000/1 perc/44321
Old Rock (1996) 10 min. 2222/4221/timp/strings

Ensemble
Sabbath (1981) 20 min. jazz ensemble (5 saxophones, 5 trumpets, 4 trombones, electric guitar, electric bass, piano, drums)
The Tail of Pinky Oozgreen and the Mossbrains (1983) 20 min. jazz ensemble (5 saxophones, 5 trumpets, 4 trombones, electric guitar, electric bass, piano, drums)
Stillness Dancing (1983, revised 1984) 10 min. 11 players (1111/1000/1 perc/pf/10111)
Mobile (1984) 18 min. 10 trombones (8 tenors, 2 bass), 2 percussion
Prelude (Under the Thin Rainfall) (1985) 7 min. flute, clarinet, horn, harp, violin, cello
Tapisse(reve)rie (1986) 13 min. 11 players (1111/1110/10111)
Memories of a Landscape – II (1988) 15 min. 13 strings (44221)
Daring the Wilderness (1991) 12 min. percussion ensemble (5 players)
Etude pour une Fete (Jazz II) (1991) 6 min. alto saxophone (or clarinet), trumpet, trombone, cello, double bass, piano
Neue Bilder (Der Holle Rache) (1991) 10 min. piccolo, oboe, Eb clarinet, trumpet, percussion, viola, cello, double bass
Wine of Dragons (1993) 7 min.
Version I: Taiko ensemble – 9 performers
Version II (1997): percussion ensemble (9 players)
Kaleidarray (Jazz III) (1994) 15 min. violin/bass violin, clarinet/bass clarinet, trumpet, Thai gongs, vibraphone, marimba, piano
Cuimhneachan Urramach (1995) 15 min. solo cello and 14 players (1111/1110/1 perc/pf/11111)
Octane-VX (1996) 8 min. flute, oboe, clarinet, bassoon, horn, trumpet, trombone, double bass
Can(y)on (1997) 3 min. clarinet, trumpet, vibraphone, marimba, piano, violin, double bass
bien serré (1999) 20 min. jazz ensemble (4 saxophones, 4 trumpets, 4 trombones, electric guitar, electric bass, keyboard, drums)
KappaMusik (2002) 13 min. jazz ensemble (4 saxophones, 2 trumpets, 2 trombones, 2 electric guitars, drums)
aXis (2006) 12 min. 13 players (1111/1111/11111)
soundskein (2006) 15 min. two string quartets

Chamber music
Images (1983) 17 min. flute, vibraphone, violin, viola, cello
Encounters – II (1984) 10 min. percussion duo
String Quartet (1984) 10 min. 2 violins, viola, cello
Jazz (1985) 7 min. saxophone quartet (soprano, alto, tenor, baritone)
Here the Bird (1993) 13 min. viola, piano
Épanoui (1995) 12 min. flute, cello, piano
Tyee (1995) 13 min. bass flute and percussion
Consort: Dances of the Borealis (1998) 15 min. two pianos, two percussion
Cachées (2000) 11 min. guitar and cello
nmaya (Kokopeli II) (2002) 12 min. percussion and piano
TreDue Sextet (2010) 10 min. flute, clarinet, marimba/vibraphone, piano, violin, violoncello.

Instrumental
Exposures (1984) 7 min. horn
Portrait (1984) 8 min. flute
Piano (1989) 14 min. piano
Variations (1989) 21 min. piano
Song for Nobody (1990) 8 min. Bb clarinet (alternative version for Bb bass clarinet with extended low register)
Ma'dhanah (1990) 12 min. Accordion
flung loose into the stars (1995) 10 min. piano
Exh... (1999) 5 min. piccolo
Édifices (naturels) (2001) 10 min. piano
pLayer8a (2007) 5 min. player piano

Vocal and choral
Five Poems by Richard Brautigan (1981) 8 min. mezzo-soprano, flute, cello, percussion, piano
Soft Morning (1983) 7 min. (text by James Joyce) soprano solo (alternative version for mezzo-soprano)
Singing a silence of stone (1983) 6 min. (text by e.e. cummings) soprano, harp, 2 percussion
Two Psalms (1986) 14 min. Lullaby (Psalm 23), Jubilate Domino (Psalm 100) SATB chorus, harp
Jubilate Domino (Psalm 100) SATB chorus, harp
Reflections on a Prayer of Saint Augustine (1987) 13 min. (text in Latin from St. Augustine's Confessions, and The Song of Songs) SATB chorus (36 parts, 9 groups)
one winter after(a flower)noon (1987) 8 min. (text by e.e. cummings). soprano, bass clarinet, cello, piano
Cantico delle Creature (1993) 23 min. (text by St. Francis of Assisi) mezzo-soprano, choir (SSAATTBB), chamber orchestra (2222/2220/3 perc/piano, celeste/22222), soundfiles
re: Hallelujah (2005) 5.5 min. (text by Leonard Cohen) soprano and chamber orchestra (1111/1111/perc/piano/11111)

Electroacoustic
Sonnet Sonore (1985) 14 min. oboe and stereo electroacoustic
Voyage (1986) 15 min. 4-channel electroacoustic
Per Foramen Acus Transire (1987) 15 min. flute/bass flute and stereo electroacoustic
Night-flowering ... not even sand – I (1989) 12 min. bassoon and electroacoustic
Night-flowering ... not even sand – II (1990) 9 min. stereo electroacoustic
Spangled (1996) 5 min. stereo electroacoustic
Jardinages – I (2000) 6 min. electric guitar and tape
Jardinages – II (2000) 6 min. stereo electroacoustic
On Frogs (2000) 13 min. reciter, interactive electronics (3 players)
Anasazi: Kokopeli I (2001) 11 min. amplified piccolo and electronics
Xmix (2001) 12 min. stereo electroacoustic
Chaotika (2001) 12 min. percussion and interactive electronics
jem (2003) 3 min. 4-channel electroacoustic
Wild Fruits: Prologue (2004) 16 min. 8-channel electracoustic (alternate version with slides)
Wild Fruits: Installation (2004) open duration keyboard controller, sampler, stereo electroacoustic
Mashup: Derome vs Oliveros (2005) 7 min. stereo electroacoustic
Wild Fruits 2: like a ragged flock, like pulverized jade (2006) 11 min. amplified alto flute, live electronics, 8-channel electracoustic
blueBob (Dylan Remix) (2006) 5 min. stereo electroacoustic
Ariel Fragments (2007) 17 min. SSSAAA choir, 8-channel electroacoustic
pLayer8b (2008) 5 min. 8-channel electroacoustic
re:Nude (2008) 4.5 min. stereo electroacoustic
re:Nude:ty (2008) 1 min. stereo electroacoustic
Wild Fruits 3: Chestnuts (2008) 13 min. 8-channel electroacoustic
re:Reckoner (2009) 4.5 min. stereo electroacoustic
Duol (2009) 7 min. violin, guitar, soundfiles
Raindown (MegMix) (2009) 4.5 min. stereo electroacoustic

Educational music
Dance Set (2009) 8 min. two cellos, Grade 4 level

Music theatre
Scenes From a Theatre on Mars (1984) 15 min. (Text: James Harley, adapted from The Last Days of Mankind by Karl Kraus) 2 speaking/acting roles (1 male, 1 female), 2 cl (2nd doubles sax), tp/flugel, vn/vl, vc.

Affiliations
James Harley is an Associate Composer of the Canadian Music Centre, and a board member of the Canadian League of Composers. He is also a member of the American Composers Forum, the Canadian Electroacoustic Community, and the International Computer Music Association.

Selected performers
Arraymusic, Codes d'Accès, Composers' Orchestra, Continuum, Corey Hamm  Marc Couroux, ECM, Hammerhead Consort, Kappa, Kore, Kovalis Duo, Duo Vira, Groundswell, Hammerhead Consort, Lafayette String Quartet, McGill Contemporary Music Ensemble, McGill Symphony Orchestra, Elizabeth McNutt, New Music Concerts, Patricia O'Callahan, Oshawa-Durham Symphony, Open Ears Festival, Penderecki String Quartet, Polish Society for New Music, Brigitte Poulin, Prince George Symphony, Ben Reimer, SMCQ, Transmission, Trio Phoenix, Trio Fibonacci, Alain Trudel, University of Guelph Women's Chamber Choir, Vancouver Bach Choir, Ellen Waterman.

Further reading
Steenhuisen, Paul. 2009. "Interview with James Harley." In Sonic Mosaics: Conversations with Composers. Edmonton: University of Alberta Press. 
Couroux, Marc. Daring the Wilderness. The Music of James Harley.
Couroux, Marc. Daring the Wilderness: The Music of James Harley. Musicworks 69 (1997), 42–50.
Couroux, Marc: James Harley. Circuit, Vol. 8/1 (Spring 1999).
Homma, Martina: James Harley. In Komponisten der Gegenwart, Gesamtverzeichnis. Munich: Edition text-kritik.
Various writings on Xenakis by James Harley.
Harley, James. "The Hills Are Alive…: Wild Fruits Creative Soundscapes Project." eContact! 10.3 — Symposium Électroacoustique de Toronto 2007 Toronto Electroacoustic Symposium (May 2008). Montréal: CEC.
Harley, James. Does the Music Make the Technology Better: The Case of The Residents. In Music, Arts and Technologies: Toward a Critical Approach. Paris: l'Harmattan, 2004.
Harley, James. The Continuous Now: Peter Hatch's Musical Vision and Community Presence. Musicworks 86, 2003.
Harley, James. Considerations of Lutoslawski's Conception of Symphonic Form. Lutoslawski Studies, ed. Z. Skowron, Oxford University Press, 2001.
Harley, James. The New Nihilism: L'objet sonore and the music of Richard Barrett. Musicworks 72, 1998.
Harley, James. Generative Processes in Algorithmic Composition: Music and Chaos. Leonardo 28/3, 1995.

References

External links
Classical Composers Database entry.
Chaotika performance.

1959 births
Living people
People from Vernon, British Columbia
Canadian classical composers
20th-century classical composers
21st-century classical composers
Electroacoustic music composers
Canadian male classical composers
20th-century Canadian composers
20th-century Canadian male musicians
21st-century Canadian male musicians